Coleg Ceredigion, formerly known as  Aberystwyth Technical College and later as Aberystwyth College of Further Education, is a bilingual further education college in Ceredigion, Wales. It has two campuses in the two largest towns in Ceredigion, namely Aberystwyth  and Cardigan  The Principal is Andrew Cornish.

External links

College website

Buildings and structures in Aberystwyth
Universities and colleges in Wales
Education in Ceredigion